Rumpelstiltskin is a film from 1940 directed by Alf Zengerling. It stars Paul Walker as the title character.

Cast 
 Paul Walker – Rumpelstilzchen
 Hermann Schröder – Miller
 Trude Häfelin – Miller's daughter
 Otto Bredow – King
 Jutta von Alpen – Page
 Kurt Lauermann – Treasurer

References

External links 
 Rumpelstilzchen (1940) at filmportal.de
 Rumpelstilzchen (1940) at OFDb.de (in German)

1940 films
1940s fantasy films
German fantasy films
German children's films
1940s German-language films
Films based on Rumpelstiltskin
German black-and-white films
1940s German films